My Zinc Bed is a 2008 British television drama film directed by Anthony Page and based on the stage play of the same name by David Hare. It was commissioned by the BBC and produced in association with HBO Films.

Plot

The one-off drama follows Alcoholics Anonymous member Paul Peplow (Paddy Considine) who is sent to interview wealthy businessman Victor Quinn (Jonathan Pryce). Victor's obsession with addiction soon makes sense when Paul meets Victor's beautiful wife Elsa (Uma Thurman) – who reveals that she herself is a recovering alcoholic.

Locations
The film is shot in many locations across London, including the now-standard "crossing the Thames" introductory shot backdropped by St. Paul's Cathedral and the 30 St Mary Axe Swiss Re office building (commonly referred to as "The Gherkin"). The Quinn's new residence is shown to be in the locale of the real Regent's Park.

Reception

Critical
The drama was well received by some critics, mostly overcoming the distraction of its high-powered cast. It was both commended and criticized for its retention of its stage-play roots.

Ratings
The drama was seen by around 1 million viewers, considered poor ratings, especially given Thurman's involvement.

References

External links

2008 television films
2008 films
Films shot at Elstree Film Studios
Films about alcoholism
Films scored by Simon Boswell
2008 drama films
Films directed by Anthony Page
Television shows shot at Elstree Film Studios
2000s English-language films
2000s British films
British drama television films
English-language drama films